The 2014 United States House of Representatives elections in Ohio were held on Tuesday, November 4, 2014 to elect the 16 U.S. representatives from the state of Ohio, one from each of the state's 16 congressional districts. The elections coincided with the elections of other federal and state offices, including a gubernatorial election.

Overview
Results of the 2014 United States House of Representatives elections in Ohio by district:

District 1

The 1st district is based in Cincinnati, stretching southwestward to Ohio's borders with Kentucky and Indiana. It represented by two-term Republican Congressman Steve Chabot.

Republican primary

Candidates

Nominee
Steve Chabot, incumbent U.S. Representative

Primary results

Democratic primary

Candidates

Nominee
Fred Kundrata, Air Force Veteran and Republican candidate for Ohio's 2nd congressional district in 2012

Eliminated in primary
Jim Prues, marketing executive

Primary results

General election

Endorsements

Results

District 2

The 2nd district takes eastern Cincinnati and its suburbs, including Norwood and Loveland, and stretches eastward along the Ohio River. This seat has been held by Republican Brad Wenstrup since 2013.

Republican primary

Candidates

Nominee
Brad Wenstrup, incumbent U.S. Representative

Primary results

Democratic primary

Candidates

Nominee
Marek Tyszkiewicz, actuary and former high school teacher

Eliminated in primary
Ronny Richards, Vietnam War Veteran
John Sheil, attorney
William Smith, truck driver and nominee for this district in 2012

Primary results

General election

Endorsements

Results

District 3

The 3rd district, located entirely within the borders of Franklin County, taking in inner Columbus, Bexley, Whitehall, as well as Franklin County's share of Reynoldsburg. It's been represented by Democrat Joyce Beatty since 2013.

Democratic primary

Candidates

Nominee
Joyce Beatty, incumbent U.S. Representative

Primary results

Republican primary

Candidates

Nominee
John Adams, manufacturing company owner and candidate for this seat in 2012

Eliminated in primary
Eric Vennon

Primary results

General election

Endorsements

Results

District 4

The 4th district, nicknamed the "duck district", sprawls from the Columbus exurbs, including Marion and Lima into north-central Ohio, taking in Oberlin. It has been represented by Republican Jim Jordan since 2007.

Republican primary

Candidates

Nominee
Jim Jordan, incumbent U.S. Representative

Primary results

Democratic primary

Candidates

Nominee
Janet Garrett, retired teacher

Primary results

General election

Endorsements

Results

District 5

The 5th district encompasses Northwestern Ohio, taking in Findlay, Defiance, and Bowling Green. It's been represented by Republican Bob Latta since 2007.

Republican primary

Candidates

Nominee
Bob Latta, incumbent U.S. Representative

Primary results

Democratic primary

Candidates

Nominee
Robert Fry, clergy

Primary results

Libertarian primary

Candidates

Nominee
Eric Eberly and nominee for this seat in 2012

Primary results

General election

Endorsements

Results

District 6

The 6th district encompasses Appalachian Ohio, including Steubenville, Marietta, and Ironton. It's been represented by Bill Johnson since 2011.

Republican primary

Candidates

Nominee
Bill Johnson, incumbent U.S. Representative

Primary results

Democratic primary

Candidates

Nominee
Jennifer Garrison, former state representative

Eliminated in primary
Gregory Howard

Declined
Lou Gentile, state senator
Anthony Traficanti, Mahoning County Commissioner

Primary results

Green primary

Candidates

Nominee
Dennis Lambert

Primary results

General election

Endorsements

Debates
Complete video of debate, September 30, 2014

Predictions

Results

District 7

The 7th district is based in northeastern Ohio, and includes the city of Canton. It's been represented by Republican Bob Gibbs since 2011.

Republican primary

Candidates

Nominee
Bob Gibbs, incumbent U.S. Representative

Primary results

Democratic primary
Ultimately he didn't run for any seat.

Candidates

Declined
John Boccieri, former U.S. Representative

General election

Endorsements

Results

District 8

The 8th district takes in the northern suburbs of Cincinnati, including Butler County, as well as taking in Springfield. Republican John Boehner, the Speaker of the House, has represented  since 1991.

Republican primary
Though Republican aides believed Boehner would step down as House speaker in 2014, Boehner had insisted that he would run for reelection to the House and as Speaker. Boehner faced primary challenges from two conservatives,  Eric Gurr and  J.D. Winteregg

Candidates

Nominee
John Boehner, incumbent U.S. Representative

Eliminated in primary
Eric Gurr, computer consultant
J.D. Winteregg, high school teacher and Tea Party member

Primary results

Democratic primary

Candidates

Nominee
Tom Poetter, professor at Miami University

Eliminated in primary
Matthew Guyette

Primary results

Constitution primary

Candidates

Nominee
Jim Condit, Jr

Primary results

General election

Endorsements

Results

District 9

The 9th district spans the coast of Lake Erie from Toledo to the west side of Cleveland, taking in Port Clinton, Sandusky, Lorain, Lakewood, Brook Park, and Brooklyn. Marcy Kaptur has represented  since 1983.

Democratic primary

Candidates

Nominee
Marcy Kaptur, incumbent U.S. Representative

Declined
Isaac Quiñones II, former campaign aide

Primary results

Republican primary

Candidates

Nominee
Richard May

Eliminated in primary
Robert C. Horrocks, Jr.

Primary results

General election

Endorsements

Results

District 10

The 10th district encompasses the Dayton metro area, including Dayton and the surrounding suburbs. It's been held by Republican Congressman Mike Turner since 2003.

Republican primary

Candidates

Nominee
Mike Turner, incumbent U.S. Representative

Eliminated in primary
John D. Anderson, civilian air force acquisition logistics and sustainment manager and candidate for this seat in 2012

Primary results

Democratic primary

Candidates

Nominee
Robert Klepinger

Eliminated in primary
Bill Conner, programmer and Air Force Veteran

Withdrawn
Russ Gottesman

Primary results

Libertarian primary

Candidates

Nominee
David Harlow

Primary results

General election

Endorsements

Results

District 11

The 11th district takes in eastern Cleveland and its suburbs, including Euclid, Cleveland Heights, and Warrensville Heights, as well as stretching southward into Richfield and parts of Akron. It's been represented by Democrat Marcia Fudge since 2008.

Democratic primary

Candidates

Nominee
Marcia Fudge, incumbent U.S. Representative

Primary results

Republican primary

Candidates

Nominee
Mark Zetzer

Primary results

General election

Endorsements

Results

District 12

The 12th district encompasses the northern Columbus metro area, taking in the northern Columbus suburbs, including Dublin, Westerville, Gahanna, and New Albany, as well as, Newark, Mansfield, and Zanesville. It's been held by Republican Congressman Pat Tiberi since 2001.

Republican primary

Candidates

Nominee
Pat Tiberi, incumbent U.S. Representative

Primary results

Democratic primary

Candidates

Nominee
David Tibbs, Army Veteran

Primary results

Green primary

Candidates

Nominee
Bob Hart

Primary results

General election

Endorsements

Results

District 13

The 13th district covers the Mahoning Valley in northeastern Ohio, including Youngstown and eastern parts of Akron. Democrat Tim Ryan is running for reelection.

Democratic primary

Candidates

Nominee
Tim Ryan, incumbent U.S. Representative

Eliminated in primary
John Stephen Luchansky

Primary results

Republican primary

Candidates

Nominee
Thomas Pekarek

Primary results

General election

Endorsements

Results

District 14

The 14th district is located in Northeast Ohio, taking in the eastern suburbs and exurbs of Cleveland, including Mayfield Heights, Solon, and Independence, as well as Ashtabula, Lake, and Geauga counties, northern Portage County, and northeastern Summit County. Republican Representative David Joyce has represented the 14th district since January 2013.

Republican primary
Joyce was challenged in the Republican primary by State Representative Matt Lynch. Joyce, who has been called "Ohio's most vulnerable House Republican", did not win a primary election for the seat in 2012 after incumbent Republican Steve LaTourette retired months after winning the primary unopposed, leading local party leaders to pick Joyce to replace him.

Candidates

Nominee
David Joyce, incumbent U.S. Representative

Eliminated in primary
Matt Lynch, state representative

Primary results

Democratic primary

Candidates

Nominee
Michael Wager, attorney

Primary results

Libertarian primary

Candidates

Nominee
David Macko

Primary results

General election

Endorsements

Predictions

Results

District 15

The 15th district encompasses the southern Columbus metro area, taking in the western and eastern suburbs of Columbus, including Upper Arlington, Hilliard, and Grove City, as well as Athens. It's been held by Republican Steve Stivers since 2011.

Republican primary

Candidates

Nominee
Steve Stivers, incumbent U.S. Representative

Primary results

Democratic primary

Candidates

Nominee
Scott Wharton, farmer, airline pilot and candidate for this seat in 2012

Primary results

General election

Endorsements

Results

District 16

The 16th district takes in the western suburbs of Cleveland, including Westlake, Parma, and Strongsville, as well Medina, Norton, and North Canton. It's been held by Republican Jim Renacci since 2011.

Republican primary

Candidates

Nominee
Jim Renacci, incumbent U.S. Representative

Primary results

Democratic primary
Democrats were hoping to recruit a strong challenger to Renacci, as he had only won by 4 points in 2012.

Candidates

Nominee
Pete Crossland, Emeritus Professor of Political Science at Kent State University and former state representative

Eliminated in primary
James Donenwirth, businessman

Primary results

General election

Endorsements

Results

See also
 2014 United States House of Representatives elections
 2014 United States elections

References

External links
U.S. House elections in Ohio, 2014 at Ballotpedia
Campaign contributions at OpenSecrets

Ohio
2014
United States House of Representatives